A Peace Pagoda is a Buddhist stupa; a monument to inspire peace, designed to provide a focus for people of all races and creeds, and to help unite them in their search for world peace. Most, though not all, peace pagodas built since World War II have been built under the guidance of Nichidatsu Fujii (1885–1985), a Buddhist monk from Japan and founder of the Nipponzan-Myōhōji Buddhist Order. Fujii was greatly inspired by his meeting with Mahatma Gandhi in 1931 and decided to devote his life to promoting non-violence. In 1947, he began constructing Peace Pagodas as shrines to world peace. The first was inaugurated at Kumamoto in 1954.

Peace Pagodas were built as a symbol of peace in Japanese cities, including Hiroshima and Nagasaki where atomic bombs took the lives of over 150,000 people, almost all of whom were civilian, at the end of World War II. By 2000, eighty Peace Pagodas had been built around the world in Europe, Asia, and the United States.

The Nipponzan-Myōhōji monks of the New England Peace Pagoda were awarded the Courage of Conscience award 5 June 1998 in Sherborn, Massachusetts.

Asia

Bangladesh

Comilla

World Peace Pagoda Analayo is located at the premises of New Salban Vihara, Comilla. It is the first Thai architecture Pagoda in Bangladesh and which was designed by Thai architect. The 100 feet tall Pagoda is rich in Thai artistic beauty both inside and outside. A 30 feet Standing Buddha image installed in front of the pagoda is a symbol of compassion and kindness. It is inaugurated in 2017. 
Founder: Venerable Sugato Bhikkhu by the support of his spiritual teacher Most Venerable Phrathep Mongkolyarn chief abbot of Wat Phutthabucha, Bangkok, Thailand with his Thai devotees.

India

Rajgir 

The Rajgir Vishwa Shanti Stupa/World Peace Pagoda was completed in 1969 at Rajgir hills near Rajgir, near the Vulture's Peak where the Buddha is believed to have preached the Lotus Sutra. The dedication coincided with the 100th anniversary of the birth of Mahatma Gandhi. The site also includes a Nipponzan Myohoji temple.

Darjeeling 

The shanthi stupas in India were established by Fuji Guru for World Peace.  The Nipponzan Myōhōji Buddhist temple at Charlimont in Darjeeling is one of them. Work on the Stupa began in 1972 and it was dedicated on 1 November 1992.

Delhi 

A Vishwa Shanti Stupa/World Peace Pagoda in New Delhi was inaugurated on 20th. November 2007 by monks and nuns of Nipponzan-Myōhōji, the Dalai Lama and the Lt. Governor of Delhi. It is situated in Millennium Indraprastha Park, North-East of Humayun's Tomb, adjacent to Delhi Ring Road.

A traditional Japanese garden has been constructed in the area around the stupa. The garden is a joint project by the Fujii Guruji Vishwa Shanti Stupa Committee and the Delhi Development Authority.

Dhauli Giri, Bhubaneswar, Orissa 

The Dhauli Giri Shanti Stupa (Peace Pagoda) was built in Bhubaneswar, Orissa State during a two-year period, and was inaugurated on 8 November 1972. It was established by Sri Nitya Nanda Kanungo, Governor of Bihar, with the spiritual guidance of Nichidatsu Fujii, whose monks helped build the Peace Pagoda.

Ladakh 

The Shanti Stupa in Ladakh was built by Nipponzan-Myōhōji monks, headed by Head monk Nakamura, with the help of local people. The Shanti Stupa holds the relics of the Buddha at its base, enshrined by the 14th Dalai Lama himself It is situated at a hilltop in Changspa village providing a bird's eye view of Leh town and the surrounding mountain peaks. The 14th and current Dalai Lama inaugurated the Shanti Stupa in August 1985.

Vaishali 
The stupa at Vaishali was inaugurated 23 October 1996. Vaishali is an important place in the life of the Buddha.

Wardha 

Vishwa Shanti stupa was a dream of Nichidatsu Fujii. It is beside Gitai Mandir. It is a large stupa of white color. Statues of Buddha are mounted on the stupa, facing in four directions. It also has a small Japanese Buddhist temple with a large park. There is a temple near the stupa where prayers are done for universal peace.

Japan

Kumamoto 
Work on Hanaokayama Peace Pagoda, the first Peace Pagoda constructed by Nipponzan Myohoji Japanese Buddhist monks, began in 1947 atop Mount Hanaoka, Kumamoto with basic hand tools.   It took seven years to build, being inaugurated in 1954: it was the first of over 80 built by Fujii and his followers all over the world.

Hiroshima 

The Hiroshima Peace Pagoda  was built in 1966 by Nipponzan Myohoji Buddhist monks. It commemorate the lives lost in the A-bomb blast, and contains gifts of Buddha's ashes from the then Prime Minister of India and Mongolian Buddhists. It is notable for being built partially of steel.

Nagasaki 
The Peace Pagoda in Nagasaki, the site of the second A-Bomb attack, was inaugurated by Nipponzan in 1970.

Mount Kijosumi 
At Mount Kiyosumi, the most predominant ceremonies held by Nipponzan tend to take place. The Pagoda was inaugurated in 1969.

Narita-shi, Chiba-ken 

Built in 1984, dedicated 13 May 2001, the peace pagoda at Narita-shi in Chiba Prefecture is 58 m high and situated on a small hill.

Gotemba, Shizuoka 
Founded in 1964, the Gotemba Peace Pagoda in Shizuoka Prefecture includes a Nipponzan-Myōhōji temple.

Sapporo 
This Peace Pagoda (Stupa) was built by Nipponzan-Myōhōji monks in 1959 halfway up Mount Moiwa. It was built to commemorate peace after World War II and can be seen from almost anywhere in Sapporo. It contains some of the ashes of the Buddha that were presented to the Emperor of Japan by Prime Minister Nehru in 1954. Later, another part of these were presented to Mikhail Gorbachev by the famous Nipponzan-Myōhōji monk, Junsei Terasawa.

Korea

Jeju Island
The Stupa is built in Jeju Island on the site where Venerable Masters Bowoo (d. 1565) and Jiahn (d. 1729) died. They gave their lives for Buddhism. The Stupa is the centre of many activities for the propagation of world peace and the unification of Korea. One such activity is the Lotus Sutra writing movement, and on 15 August each year people come and place hand-written copies of the Lotus Sutra into the Pagoda. This stupa is not associated with Nipponzan-Myōhōji.

Nepal

Lumbini
The Lumbini Shanti Stupa/Peace Pagoda in Nepal was constructed by Nipponzan Myohoji monks and dedicated in November 2001 at the Buddhist pilgrimage site in kapilvastu district lumbini zone Nepal, where Queen Mayadevi is said to have given birth to Siddhartha Gautama, who in turn, as the Buddha Gautama, gave birth to the Buddhist tradition.

Pokhara

Balanced on a narrow ridge high above Phewa Tal, the brilliant-white Shanti Stupa in Pokhara is a massive Buddhist stupa which was constructed by Buddhist monks from the Japanese Nipponzan Myōhōji organisation. Besides being an impressive sight in itself, the shrine is a vantage point which has views of the Annapurna range and Pokhara city. The shining golden statue depicts the Buddha in the posture he assumed when he was born.

Sri Lanka

Ampara

The Ampara Peace Pagoda was built by Nipponzan monks under the leadership of Nichidatsu Fujii and was inaugurated on 27 February 1988. Ceremonies here are attended by large numbers of people.

Bandarawela
The Bandarawela Peace Pagoda (also known Sama Chethiya in Sinhala)  is located between the towns of Bandarawela Etampitiya road 6 Kilometers towards Bandarawela to Etampitiya. It was completed by Niponzan Myohoji monks in 1982.

Unawatuna

The Unawatuna Peace Pagoda, built by Nipponzan Myohoji monks, is on the headland between Unawatuna and Galle.

Walapane
The Walapane Peace Pagoda, built by Nichidatsu Fuhi monk, is located on Walapane, Central Province of Sri Lanka. 
This is also called Japanese Sama Viharaya Walapane.

Peace Pagoda is an enormous shrine, recently restored to become one of the most prominent landmarks in Walapane. In addition Peace pagoda is located on a top of a mountain providing adorable views of a mountain range to the visitors. With many opportunities for tourists whom are eager to cycling and walking among the sites, this is a quite relaxing getaway from the busy life patterns.

Australia

Brisbane

Created by the Kingdom of Nepal for the 1988 World Exposition, Brisbane's World Expo '88, the Brisbane Nepal Peace Pagoda is now a permanent commemorative structure of the Expo. It is located at the transformed Expo site, South Bank Parklands.

The three-story Pagoda was constructed of 80 tons of art-carved Nepalese Terai timbers and assembled on the Expo site for the World Expo´88. It was relocated to its new riverfront location at the conclusion of the Expo for the opening of the Parklands in 1992. It now features commemorative displays of the Expo and is a place for quiet and reflection. There is a Peace Bell, and  a Peace Post in the Pagoda garden. The Peace Pagoda in Brisbane was built by German architect Jochen Reier and architect Dean Ricker for the World EXPO´88 on behalf of the Kingdom of Nepal. Reier also constructed the Peace Pagoda in Munich, Germany, for the IGA ´83  and the World EXPO´90 Peace Pagoda in Osaka, Japan. This Pagoda is not associated with Nipponzan.

Europe

Munich, Germany

The Peace Pagoda in Munich's Westpark was built by German architect Jochen Reier (APAC) on behalf of the Kingdom of Nepal in 1982-1983. The temple was constructed with 80 tons of precious Sissam timber (rose wood) logged in the Terai (lowlands of Nepal) and was then carved by hand with intricate patterns. Over 300 Nepalese artisans in the Kathmandu area helped to build it. The Kingdom of Nepal was awarded with the gold medal for best nation building of the IGA´83 in Munich. Today the Peace Pagoda is part of Munich's Westpark because thousands of citizens and visitors helped to keep the "Asian Essemble" – and especially this Nepalese Shiva Pagoda – as a constantly remaining symbol of World Peace.

Vienna, Austria

The Vienna Peace Pagoda, on the Danube River, was built on land donated by Elisabeth Lindmayer. Nipponzan Myohoji monks constructed the Pagoda, which was completed in 1983, the first peace pagoda in continental Europe. The Nipponzan Myohoji order led by Rev. Gyosei Masunaga have been active here for 25 years.

England

Birmingham
On 26 June 1998, the Dhamma Talaka Pagoda was dedicated in the Ladywood district of Birmingham. The Burmese monk and scholar, Aggamahapandita Rewata Dhamma, was the prime mover behind the planning of the pagoda and the new monastic complex that developed on the same grounds. Enshrined above its dome are Buddha relics once belonging to the Burmese royal family. The building therefore serves as a pilgrimage site and a focus for the Burmese community in Britain.

Milton Keynes

The Milton Keynes Peace Pagoda was completed in 1980 at the western edge of Willen lake in Willen, Milton Keynes.  This was the first Nipponzan-Myōhōji Peace Pagoda in the western world. There is a Nipponzan-Myōhōji Order temple and monastery nearby.

London 
The London Peace Pagoda was completed in 1985 on the south side of the River Thames in Battersea Park, London. Granting permission to build it was the last legislative act of the Greater London Council.

Comiso, Italy
The Comiso Peace Pagoda, built by Nipponzan Myohoji monks, was dedicated on 24 May 1998, the Reverend Morishita at Comiso (Contrada Canicarao, 100) in Sicily, Italy near the NATO base there.

Latvia
The Peace Pagoda in Latvia was opened on 28 June 2014 near Garoza village in Salgale parish, Ozolnieki Municipality.

North America

St Norbert, Manitoba, Canada

A stupa has been constructed at the St Norbert Arts Centre in St. Norbert (Winnipeg, Manitoba), Canada.

Los Álamos, Valle de Bravo, Mexico

The Asociación Cultural Tibetana A.C. ("Garuda") is constructing a stupa at Los Álamos, Valle de Bravo, Mexico State under the patronage of Tenzin Wangyal Rinpoche.

San Francisco, California, US

The Peace Pagoda in San Francisco is a five-tiered concrete stupa in Nihonmachi (Japantown) between Post and Geary Streets at Buchanan. It is part of the Japan Center complex which opened in 1968.  It was designed by Japanese architect Yoshiro Taniguchi and presented to San Francisco by the people of Osaka, Japan. This stupa is not associated with Nipponzan-Myōhōji.

Leverett, Massachusetts, US

The New England Peace Pagoda is the first Nipponzan-Myōhōji Peace Pagoda to be built in the US and was completed in 1985. The Franklin County Technical School brought students from their electrical, plumbing, and carpentry shops to assist in building the temple.

Grafton, New York, US

The Grafton Peace Pagoda in  Grafton, New York was founded by nun Jun Yasuda, who serves as its caretaker, and was dedicated in 1993. The site, originally donated by local activist Hank Hazelton and built over several years by the surrounding communities, includes a temple, gardens, pond and the pagoda. Each year on September 11, a group of marchers begin a walk at the Grafton Peace Pagoda Site and end in New York City two weeks later.

Great Smoky Mountains, US

, the Great Smoky Mountains Peace Pagoda is under construction. Land for the construction of the Great Smoky Mountains Peace Pagoda was purchased in 2000 and, by the end of 2014, a temple, gardens, Stone Pagoda, Spirit Garden, and guest house had been completed. Construction of the Peace Pagoda/Stupa itself is ongoing. The architectural design of Darjeeling Peace Pagoda is the model for the Peace Pagoda in the Smoky Mountains.

Gallery

See also 
 Pan'kivka – Peace Pagoda Building
 Japanese Peace Bell

References

External links

 Dharmawalk.org: Information on Nichidatsu Fujii, Peace Pagodas and the work of Nipponzan Myōhōji.
 
 Panoramic picture of stupa on the shore of the Danube

1954 introductions
1954 establishments in Japan
Stupas
Pagodas
Peace monuments and memorials
Buddhism and society